The Liberation Tower was a tower in Chișinău, Bessarabia. King Michael I of Romania, his mother, Helen of Greece and Denmark, and Foreign Minister Mihai Antonescu attended the opening ceremony on November 1, 1942, in Ghidighici. 

The monument was located on a hill in front of the city of Chișinău, on the road to Ungheni. More than 500 workers worked on it for 60 days, in August–October 1942, using stone from the quarries in Ghidighici and Cricova. The structure consisted of three parts:
The tower, made of white stone, square in shape and about 30 meters high.
A stone block with a pisanie, in front of the tower, almost 8 meters high.
A colonnade (propylaea), made of stone columns, on the right side of the tower.
 
The tower had 14 marble signs inlaid on its faces, representing the coats of arms of Romania, Bessarabia, Moldavia, and some important counties and cities wherein. The entrance to the tower was guarded by a bas-relief with a fragment from Trajan's Column and the following inscription: "Like Trajan's Column, we are where we were, and we remain where we are." Inside the tower there was a spiral staircase that led to a prayer room. The colonnade consisted of 24 stone pillars on which were inscribed the names of the units of the Romanian Army that had fought to regain control of Chișinău in July 1941, during Operation München.

The tower was destroyed in the fall of 1944, after the Soviet re-occupation of Bessarabia. Nowadays, the spot were the Ghidighici tower was is covered by thick industrial waste.

References

Bibliography

External links
 
 
  

History of Chișinău
Monuments and memorials in Chișinău
Towers completed in 1942
Moldova in World War II
Tourist attractions in Moldova
Towers in Moldova
1942 establishments in Romania
Demolished buildings and structures in Moldova